The following is a list of all IFT-licensed over-the-air television stations broadcasting in the Mexican state of Morelos. There are 7 television stations in Morelos.

Televisa network service (Las Estrellas and Canal 5) is supplied by retransmitters of XEX and XHTM at Altzomoni, State of Mexico.

List of television stations

|-

|-

|-

|-

|-

|-

References

Television stations in Morelos
Morelos